I-40 Country is the 29th album by Jerry Lee Lewis, released on the Mercury label in 1974.

Recording
By 1974, Lewis's remarkable hot streak on the country charts began to cool.  Although the single "He Can't Fill My Shoes" would make the Top 10, a second single, the foreboding "Tell Tale Signs," only made it to number 18, and Lewis would not see the Top 10 again until 1976.  The LP peaked at number 25 on Billboard'''s country albums chart, whereas his previous country album, 1973's Sometimes a Memory Ain't Enough, had risen to number 6.  Part of the problem may have been that Lewis was becoming increasingly bored with the sweetened sound that was by now dominating his country albums, as biographer Rick Bragg explains in Jerry Lee Lewis: His Own Story: "The harder he tried to find a hit, it seemed, the more complicated - and less like him - the music became.  The new music had a sophisticated, almost Hollywood sound, a style called countrypolitan that had put Charlie Rich back on the charts.  Hard country like Jerry Lee's style was vanishing in a wash of saccharine strings, or so it seemed...He hated to sing in a booth over one of his own prerecorded backing tracks, but it was becoming routine."  Lewis was also still touring constantly and abusing his body with booze and pills, which would catch up with him as the decade wore on.

One significant track on I-40 Country is "Room Full of Roses," a song that would launch Jerry Lee's cousin Mickey Gilley to stardom.  In 1974 alone, Gilley would score three number one country hits and, as Gilley's star rose while his own chart success dwindled in the seventies, "the Killer" did not mince words when it came to assessing his reverential cousin's talent compared to his own; in an interview with David Booth at the Beverly Hills Hotel in Toronto in 1976, which can be heard on the 1994 Bear Family box set The Locust Years'', Lewis is asked about Gilley and, after joking that he didn't know him, said "Mickey Gilley is one of the finest gentlemen you'll ever meet, a great talent, a great man.  He's worked hard all his life," but then added that when people heard a Mickey Gilley record, they thought of him.  Like Lewis and their cousin Jimmy Swaggart, Gilley was a talented pianist but, as Lewis told biographer Rick Bragg, "Neither one of them could touch me."

Track listing

References

External links

Jerry Lee Lewis albums
1973 albums
Mercury Records albums